China Beijing Environmental Exchange (CBEEX) is a corporate domestic and international environmental equity public trading platform initiated by the China Beijing Equity Exchange (CBEX) and authorized by the Beijing municipal government.

Background

Climate Crisis 
A lot of environmental policies proposed by China comes in response to the dangerous amount of emissions, especially from Carbon dioxide, their main greenhouse gas emitter. In 1980, China emitted less than 1.5 gigatons (Gt) of Carbon dioxide per capita from fossil fuels. Over the next 20 years, in conjunction with the economic reforms under Deng Xiaoping's rule, CO2 emissions rose by about 4% each year to around 3 Gts. per capita. From 2000 to 2012, the CO2 emissions rate more than doubled, and China started emitting over 9 Gts. per capita each year. While the rate slowed down over the next few years due to changes in the economy and some climate reform, emissions once again shot up to keep up with the demand for Air Conditioners. The main source of this CO2 is from coal. While China's use of oil, cement, and gas each contributed to less than 2 Gts. since 1980, coal has been responsible for over 2 Gts. of CO2 emissions in 2000 and peaked at almost 8 Gts. in the early 2010s. This mass production using coal dates back to the Seventh Five-Year plan (1986-1990) where China's division of labor was based on what region specialized in. As a result, the provinces in the coastal central areas, which are more industrialized, were the main driving forces of China's economy. Particularly, the industries which use a lot of coal were the most successful, and coal consumption is often related to China's economic growth. Along with the economic growth rhetoric, other provinces, especially the undeveloped, started to adopt the industrial work ethic and along with it, more coal consumption. Unfortunately, because some of these underdeveloped provinces like Shaanxi and Sichuan do not specialize in industrial work, their production compared to central China is severely lacking when it comes to the economy. Therefore, there is an inefficient use of land resources, and with it, wasteful coal consumption.

Origin 
CO2 emissions via coal consumption became a big focus in China's eleventh five-year plan (2006-2010). A promise in this plan was to reduce emissions with respect to GDP by 20%. One solution proposed was to establish the first Chinese emissions exchange in Tianjin in September 2008. By using the cap-and-trade model, the same molecules that created a climate crisis in China are the ones that will lead towards pollution reduction and environmental preservation while maintaining the growing Chinese economy. With the help of foreign exchanges such as the Chicago Climate Exchange and the European Climate Exchange (ECX), China had now become a major competitor in the Asian emissions market. Shortly before this, China introduced the China Beijing Environmental Exchange (CBEEX) as a general market for environmental equities. It would also adapt the goals set up by the Tianjin Climate Exchange and fulfill the environmental goals of the eleventh five-year plan.

Establishments

The Panda Standard 
Along with BlueNext and other companies, the CBEEX launched the first standard to combat greenhouse gas emissions, namely CO2 emissions, at the Copenhagen Convention in late 2009. Its aim is to create new methods that support China through means environmentally, economically, legally, socially, and efficiently while giving full transparency and credibility within the Carbon market. They would achieve this by promoting the agriculture, forestry, and other land use sector (AFOLU) under the Clean Development Mechanism (CDM) to help the impoverished work under their projects and potentially scale to very efficient methods of a cleaner environment.

Projects 
There are the four main project types in which companies can earn credits through the Panda Standard. Below are some examples in each type.

Forest Management 

 Rotation Extensions: Companies let trees age more so that they can take in more carbon.
 Harvest Rates: Companies can simply cut less trees. Moreover, efficient use of the resulting lumber by leaving no dead wood on the ground can further give credits.
 New Techniques: Sometimes, the simplest solution is to work efficiently or try new things. One can combine species of trees to further increase the life of a tree which, in turn, gives more carbon stock. One can also forego logging practices altogether for other materials that do not solve the carbon problem.
 Deforestation Measures: Preventing deforestation is a great way to earn credits. For unplanned deforestation, companies plan to use that land for vegetation or other carbon-friendly ideas.

Forestation and Vegetation Increase 

 Planting trees via seeds: Depending on the area and with respect to the habitat and efficient rundowns, credit can be earned if done correctly and without damaging the ecosystem.
 Fallow length altering: One can increase period lengths of fallows or simply planting more of them in barren areas.
 High-biomass planting: By establishing vegetation with the purpose of increasing the live biomass around it, one can prolong the life in the area which ties in to increased vegetation and crops.

Cropland Management 

 Soil Carbon Stock Increase: Changing, decreasing, or even removing tillage practices, more land being used for crops, or even exogenous carbon, are all ways to use soil efficiently without the need for emitting more carbon.
 Vegetables: Planting legumes benefits from the low-carbon cost of production, and it provides new ways for people get their food instead of from animals. Along with a campaign to dramatically reduce meat consumption and promote a healthy lifestyle so that the mass production of vegetables do not go to waste, this project has the potential to be the a huge solution to China's CO2 crisis.
 Human Management: Reduction of using machines that need fossil-fuels is a simple way to get credit. Also, solving the rice paddies problem through non-Carbon ways not only awards credit but also reduces non-Carbon emissions like methane.

Grassland Management 

 Degradation: Reduce cutting biomasses and prolong their life. The idea here is to reduce emissions by giving areas chances to regrow or heal instead of immediately converting the land to something else.
 Livestock Management: Alter grazing by controlling the movement for animals to let grasslands regrow. This also indirectly affects changes needed to grow grasslands for those animals if they are moved out of habitat.
 Species composition: Like for Forest and Cropland Management, altering the species in different areas can increase the life expectancy of lands and possibly build more suitable lands for animals and efficient carbon reductions.

Notable Transactions 
The first-ever transaction made under the Panda Standard came from Franshion Properties, affiliated with Sinochem Group, under the impression of gaining carbon neutrality. By trading with Yunnan Mengxiang Bamboo industry, Franshion Properties used 16,800 tons worth of voluntary emission reductions (VERs) to plant over 50,000 hectares of forests while developing the forest industry to decrease poverty in the areas worked. This transaction had other effects such as promoting the real estate industry for greener land and ownership.

Emission Trading System (Beijing) 
In China's Twelfth Five-Year plan (2011-2015), China wanted to further push for more environmental policies with a focus on lowering carbon emissions with respect to GDP by 17%, unlike the Eleventh Year Plan which wanted to decrease energy inefficiency overall. The plan also wanted to decrease the growth rate of GDP which posed an extra layer of difficulty of trying to lower emissions. Because of the Eleventh Five-Year plan's overall success, it proved a challenge to have smaller companies, most of which are working energy-efficient, to follow suit. To achieve this goal, China looked into their old pillar industries and found new and improved industries that achieve the same production as the old, but more environmental-friendly. An example of this is switching from coal to nuclear and solar energy. China had mentioned a carbon trade market at the time of developing the Twelfth Five-Year plan, and this would be the idea of China's Emission Trading System (ETS), which consists of seven pilots, although there was no official carbon trading scheme until late 2017. Like carbon markets in general, firms are dependent on emission permits which are granted for keeping emissions low. Without them, they are severely limited in the market and must put in efforts to lower emissions to the threshold. Once businesses have permits, they can trade them in or with other firms for carbon credit.  The purpose of setting up ETS's was to control carbon emissions by reducing them and keeping them low while adapting to greener development without substantial damage to GDP growth. This, in turn, helps the air quality in a lot of cities, especially in Beijing, one of the pilots of the ETS which opened in late 2013.

The Beijing ETS is based on the "1+1+N" policy. The first "1" sets the rules of their services, determine the jobs of all shareholders based on their speciality with respect to their rights, and the government watches over operations. All of these traits are found in the "Decision on Implementing C02 ETS in Beijing Document". The second "1" acts as the law of the ETS based on the "Interim Measures for the Management of Emissions Trading in Beijing" document where it gives clarification on the duties of each department and verifies all instruction and supervision within the carbon market. Finally, the "N" provides clarity and reminders to the first and second "1's".

The job of the CBEEX is to enforce the integrity of all the values listed in the Beijing ETS. Its main focus is to provide stability in the capital and liquidity within the trading grounds and also keep track of all purchases to make sure each and every one of them is fair and backed by the public. As the manager of the trading platform, companies must be in accordance with the CBEEX so that transactions within the platform will be verified.

There are two types of trading schemes allowed under the Beijing ETS: Beijing Emissions Allowance (BEA) and project-based offsets. The BEA is responsible for allowance allocation, and their currency is denoted tCO2 or total CO2. On the other hand, project-based offsets are responsible for regulating the Chinese Certified Emission Reductions (CCER), energy conservation projects, carbon sink projects, and the Motor Vehicles Voluntary Emission Reduction. Unlike the BEA, the units used here are tCO2e, meaning tonnes of carbon dioxide equivalent. Under these schemes, trades can be online or in-person under the supervision of the CBEEX and its rules. For online trading, there are three types of orders one can make. First, are all-or-none orders where orders are met entirely or not at all. Second, are called sweep-to-fill orders where orders are grouped based on specific traits and orders are chosen based on asking price. Third, are Limit orders where there is a set threshold price for a given product so that multiple companies can buy the same thing at the same price or higher.

Carbon Emissions Trading Scheme 
In 2017, the CBEEX, along with the European Energy Exchange (EEX), launched the official Carbon Trading Scheme. However, no trades were going to happen for quite some time. Due to the huge influence in China's economy, China had the power to essentially control the price of Carbon through the markets. Along with the EEX as its partner, the CBEEX would be a huge influence on how carbon is traded locally, nationally, and internationally. The focus this time revolved around thermal-fired power plants which are responsible for China's biggest resource consumption: coal. They are responsible for around 40% of China's carbon emissions.

Trading did not actually happen until July 2021, where $32 million worth of carbon dioxide orders were made on the first day. The price started at 48 yuan per ton, but it soon increased. Due to the large amounts of capital equations to more than 2000 plants, totaling massive amounts of carbon emissions, this new scheme easily became the biggest Carbon market in the world.

Not a lot of the functions in the old scheme do not apply in this new scheme. Unlike in the original emissions trading scheme, permits are based on emissions per unit of generation or carbon intensity, so there is no cap, although there is a threshold for these plants. This is hinted with the trend of China's emissions rate going up through the 2010s decade. China pledged to reduce emission intensity by up to 65% by 2030, the same time they pledged to peak emissions. This was up from up to 45%, around the time when the Panda Standard was in the making. The claim focuses on emissions rate and not total emissions. Since this new trading scheme focuses on thermal-powered plants, total emissions should go down because they are responsible for much of China's emissions; however, these rules do not apply to other plants that emit less. So it is theoretically possible for carbon emissions to go up if more plants are being built.

The New Chinese Certified Emission Reductions 
The CCER was introduced during the ETS project but was shut down in 2017 due to low volume. CCER was another way firms could earn credit through means other than carbon. These included other greenhouse gases like methane and nitrous oxide, and this is often seen as another policy to keep emissions low. Now, with the introduction of the National Carbon Trading Scheme, CCER is planning to return in 2022 with more options to energy in hopes of having much higher volume than before. Also, it has revamped its offset nature so that more firms will more than likely use this as credit instead of the usual national carbon market. Also in 2022, Beijing started plans for a center dedicated to the new CCER in hopes of emission costs being lowered and innovation towards greener technology.

Impact

Seven-Pilot ETS 
One of the common misconceptions of promoting greener policies is that the economic growth would slow down by a lot. The problem here is that a huge economic halt is not achievable if a country's economic growth is not increasing at an increasing rate. This is the case in China where given the over billion population, it is hard to tell whether the economy is increasing or not if talked about altogether. It usually suffices that the economy in the main cities and provinces in China, namely the pilots of the ETS, are the determiners of how well the Chinese economy is. Even then, these pilots are really different from each other. For example, Beijing and Guangdong's population differ by about 100 million people. Despite both cities having large amounts of people, there is a lot more variation in income in Guangdong. Furthermore, the specialities in Beijing differ from Guangdong because of their location, so their expected energy consumption will differ for those many reasons. As of 2014, Beijing GDP per capita was 99,163 yuan compared to Guangdong's 63,258, but in terms of energy consumption and intensity, Beijing has a higher energy consumption but lower energy intensity. It is many variations like these that is the reason why measuring overall economic growth is extremely difficult. Therefore, it is ignored under these environmental policies. It is also because of this that each pilot's ETS is different and follows different policies and attempts to achieve different goals. Out of the data, Guangdong showed the most economic loss while Beijing's losses were not as severe. This is because of the huge population that Guangdong is trying to convert to one single plan, and much of the loss of economic return comes from the loss of flexibility in Guangdong's original policy. Meanwhile, in Beijing, with a lower population and being the capital, they adopted this change much better, and as a result, losses were not only minimal, but soon gone after a few years.

The most important goal of the first ETS was that China needed to lower carbon emissions with respect to GDP. From just the firms, there was a 16.7% decrease in carbon emissions in the first two years of operation. However, the bigger picture was that China needed to lower emissions altogether, so because production by means of coal were strictly limited, firms looked elsewhere, like production via natural gas. As a result, natural gas use increased; however, the total amount of emissions decreased. Another thing that might have helped lowered emissions is that the carbon market was more political than economical. In a green market, where the economy is one of the top priorities, more often than not, this would fail since the economy would have to suffer for some time while greener technologies and practices are gradually being introduced. China's National Development and Reform Commission (NDRC) is responsible for balancing economic growth and greenhouse gas emission regulations, so it was assumed that the NDRC would put the climate crisis first while taking some consideration of the economy. In terms of analyzing pilots individually, using the example of comparing Beijing and Guangdong, the capital Beijing showed the fastest market response since they were one of the first cities to implement the ETS while the populous Guangdong had the largest emission reduction.

Throughout the 2020s, the main impact of the Seven-Pilots ETS from China's point of view would be the emergence and success of the National Carbon Trading Scheme. Given the experiment with the effects of different sectors across the different pilots with respect to the economic situation in their respective regions, China has had enough time to fully integrate their national carbon market, and potentially the biggest and most successful one in the world. As of 16 December 2021, the scheme only covered the electricity sector, the one that uses a lot of coal, so the result would be lowered carbon emissions through coal naturally, but possibly higher emissions in methane, SO2, etc. But this is part of China's long-term goals, and only time will tell if the successful integration of all sectors will be smooth, problematic, or might never happen. Given some success in the pilot stage, there is high optimism that the New Carbon Trading Scheme will find all the success.

The New Carbon Trading Scheme 
From July 2021 until now, the Chinese national carbon market is still relatively raw. In nature, this new scheme will have an impact on the economy, but it was made with political influence on the environment. However, there is no doubt that this new scheme provides efficiency. By controlling the price of carbon nationally, there is little unfairness when it comes to the open market. However, what efficiency cannot do is control the volume of trades in the market. A market can be running efficiently, but have its supply and/or demand change. This is predicted in the early 2020s when China's economy is going to increase, which implies more energy consumption. Because of the emission cuts with respect to the GDP promise, this defeats the purpose of trying to lower emissions, despite instating policies that say otherwise.

Problems with the Seven-Pilot Emissions Trading System

Allocation 
In terms of calculating allowance allocation for each pilot, there are two main ways: grandfathering, which goes off on historical data, and benchmarking, which focuses more efficiency and innovation today. Other ways involve auctioning and relative performance mechanism (RPM). In Beijing, grandfathering is used to keep track of existing sectors while benchmarking is used for newer ones. On the other hand, Guangdong uses benchmarking on electricity, cement, iron, and steel and grandfathering in the other sectors. The problem here is that historical data is necessary to determine thresholds, but a lot of companies can simply inflate their numbers to get better numbers. As a result, actual emissions are often inaccurate because some firms have been inflated with undeserving quotas. For alternates to grandfathering, auctioning seemed to be the most efficient method of determining allocation limits because of the efficiency and fairness of bids. In an economic point of view, inconsistent quotas often lead to fluctuating prices in the carbon market, and this results in changing electricity prices and other sectors feel the effects, too.

Carbon Prices 
Since the Emissions Trading System is the first carbon platform, there are bound to be mistakes and loopholes. Also, since every pilot is different, carbon prices are very different. Moreover, since this was a new thing for its time, it was very hard to determine the future of carbon assets. Also, during the beginning of these ETS's, a lot of adjustments were made on the fly just to find an equilibrium in prices. Furthermore, the people in charge of running each pilot have little to no idea how to move forward with carbon prices, so they looked to other third parties like the local government for help. As a result, decision making is often delayed and volatile. Another problem arises in the nature of the Emissions Trading System. Because of its age again, prices are often too low compared to carbon markets in Europe. Due to Europe's support that started back when the CBEEX was established, China tried to copy off of them without the same resources. One of the main resources was knowledge rather than raw materials in the form of labor. The CBEEX's first transactions were made for the sake of making transactions. In other words, the start of this carbon trade was unorganized and just for the sole purpose of helping the environment.

Low Liquidity 
The biggest factor that determines the liquidity of carbon permits is the health of the market. If there is a low volume in trade, permits become harder to liquidate since few people are on the market. If there was a small market to begin with, then the policies of that carbon market were on the disadvantage to begin with. If the supply of carbon credit is running low, which causes an increase in prices, then this would tie into the volatility of the carbon price, and therefore, drastically change the liquidity of carbon. In other words, just like any other market, the Carbon market must have a healthy supply and demand, unlike most of the pilots in the ETS. In most cases, many pilots want only the best traders to use their services, and more often than not, their demands are very complicated. While the first few years may seem like a mess from the economic standpoint, it eventually recovered, and the eventual National Carbon Trading Scheme covers a lot of liquidity problems to just one single price.

Another problem in liquidity also arises among pilots. With separate rules come separate values of Carbon credit. The advantages outweigh the disadvantages because carbon is not worth the same in all pilots. For example, around the start of the ETS, due to the high activity in Beijing, their price of carbon was 50.6 yuan per ton with the range from 30 to 77 yuan, compared to the very large Guangdong market going at 31.72 yuan per ton but ranged from single digits to 77 yuan per ton. Due to the sharp differences in prices, it is very hard for Beijing and Guangdong to be compatible with each other. Even though they are on different sides of China, there needs to be some sort of link between all seven knots, or else the liquidity of carbon would decrease.

Legislation 
Policies come from legislation or a set of rules, and in theory, must be followed. Unfortunately, legislation for the ETS has been far behind. As a result, rules, monitoring, and enforcement were all outdated for their time. One legislation, punishment was also outdated, meaning firms can actually get away with emitting a couple one. This results in firms ambitiously emitting more for their economic gains. Out of the seven pilots, only Shenzhen has power over legislation, while the other six were working with old laws. This also affects the carbon market in a way that there is no correlation between punishment and carbon prices. Because of these confounding variables, it is hard to gauge if the current Carbon prices in each pilot is actually the most efficient one.

Future 
As of 2020, the China Beijing Environmental Exchange has been renamed the China Beijing Green Exchange (CBGEX). The carbon market in Beijing has remained strong with a turnover rate of over 2 billion yuan in 2021. Before then, numerous sectors have joined the carbon market, especially the Beijing Public Transport Group, which introduced cars at lower emissions along with policies that efficiently sets the game plan for cars on the road on a daily basis. According to China's fourteenth five-year plan (2021-2025), carbon dioxide intensity would decrease by 18% and 13.5% for overall energy intensity. There was also the introduction of a carbon dioxide cap. Along with the National Carbon Trading Scheme, it would seem like China is on the road to fulfill those promises.

References

External links
Official website

Climate change in China
Commodity exchanges in China
Energy in China
Economy of Beijing
Carbon finance
Environmental policy in China